World Games is a station on the Red line of Kaohsiung MRT in Nanzih District, Kaohsiung, Taiwan. The station is named after the World Games 2009.

Station overview

The station is a four-level, elevated station with two side platforms and four exits. It is 134 meters long and is located at the intersection of Zuonan Rd. and Jhonghai Rd.

It was originally planned to be named "Banping Mountain Station", but was changed in July 2005 to its current name. Because it is the first elevated station after the line emerges from underground, the aim was to create an iconic station similar to the Taipei Metro's Jiantan station.

Public art
Public art in the station was designed by Ron Wood and Christian Karl Janssen. The artwork depicts many plants and insects, and tells the story of "Soul of the Land and the People in Southern Taiwan".

Around the station
 National Sports Training Center
 National Stadium
 Republic of China Naval Academy
 Banping Mountain
 CPC Corporation Kaohsiung Plant
 Zuoying High School

References

External links

KRTC World Games Station

2008 establishments in Taiwan
Kaohsiung Metro Red line stations
Railway stations opened in 2008